Cosmic ordering is a type of positive thinking proposed by Bärbel Mohr, who believed that a person can simply write down their wish list and wait for it to become reality. She first outlined her own version in her own magazine called Sonnenwind (Solar Wind), and then expanded these ideas into a book called The Cosmic Ordering Service: A Guide to Realising Your Dreams.

In the United Kingdom, disc jockey and TV game show host Noel Edmonds has become the main media promoter of Mohr's work.

Exponents

Noel Edmonds, the British television host, became interested in the subject after being introduced to  The Cosmic Ordering Service by his reflexologist. After having not worked on television since the end of his BBC TV show Noel's House Party in 1999, one of Edmonds' wishes was for a new challenge. Later he was offered the chance to return to television to work on Deal or No Deal. Edmonds later went on to write his own book titled Positively Happy: Cosmic Ways To Change Your Life.

Presenter Laura Hamilton claims to have used cosmic ordering to get a place on the series Dancing on Ice. Self-help author Stephen Richards believes cosmic ordering changed his life, when he changed from being in poverty to becoming a millionaire. Big Brother winner Brian Belo claimed that cosmic ordering helped him to win the 2007 show.

Similar concepts

In the Great Depression of the 1930s, Napoleon Hill popularised similar ideas in his book Think and Grow Rich. Hill's ideas were adopted for Christianity in the 1970s by radio and television evangelist Reverend Ike, who was widely heard over radio and television stations claiming that "You can't lose with the stuff I use." Similar ideas were taken up by a stream of televangelists such as Kenneth Copeland, Bob Tilton and Jim Bakker of the failed PTL television empire.

Criticism
Cosmic ordering has been criticised as "nonsense" by Carl Cooper. He describes it as goal setting dressed up in spiritual language. He also distinguishes cosmic ordering from intercessory prayer, noting that prayer is not "divine room service".

Cosmic ordering is satirized as "space-star ordering" in the "Something Happened" episode (Season 4, Episode 3) of The IT Crowd. In the episode, Douglas Reynholm joins the "Spaceologists" and makes wishes to the stars for what he wants. His wishes for a helicopter and the ability to apply tattoos come true after he buys himself a helicopter and a tattoo book, while his wish to have a robot hand comes true when his self-inked helicopter tattoo becomes infected and leads to the amputation of his hand. Douglas uses the successful fulfillment of his wishes to try to convince the IT team to join the Spaceologists.

Academia
In 2007, cosmic ordering was put forward as a solution to women's inequality in academia. Proponents advocate asking the cosmos for a promotion to help equal the playing field with men. Opponents of the concept described the approach as "scandalous" and "an opiate to dull the pain of reality". The idea is connected to the New Age movement and other concepts such as the Law of Attraction.

See also
 Affirmations (New Age)
 Elmer Gantry
 Law of attraction (New Thought)
 Synchronicity
 Word of Faith

Notes

References

 Mohr, Barbel. The Cosmic Ordering Service: A Guide to Realising your Dreams.  .

New Age practices